Liang Xinjun is a Chinese entrepreneur. He is the co-founder and former vice chairman/CEO of Fosun International, one of the largest civilian-run enterprise in China.

Biography
Liang was born in 1968 in Taizhou, Zhejiang. He received his B. A. from Fudan University in 1991, and founded Fosun with Guo Guangchang in 1992. In 2007, he received his MBA degree from Cheung Kong Graduate School of Business.

On Hurun Report's China Rich List 2013, he was ranked 233rd with an estimated wealth of US$1.140 billion.

References

External links
 Reuters
 https://www.forbes.com/profile/xinjun-liang
 Fosun International Limited

1968 births
Living people
21st-century Chinese businesspeople
Billionaires from Zhejiang
Businesspeople from Zhejiang
Cheung Kong Graduate School of Business alumni
Chinese chief executives
Chinese company founders
Fosun International people
Fudan University alumni
People from Taizhou, Zhejiang